Jono Pandolfi (born 1976) is an American ceramic artist and designer. He is a product designer and a visiting critic at the Parsons School of Design.

After studying under Regis Brodie at Skidmore College, Pandolfi taught pottery at the Millbrook School before moving to New York City to design jewelry and manage the ceramics studio at Penn South. His custom tabletop ceramic pieces are in New York City restaurants Terrace 5 and Cafe 2 at the Museum of Modern Art, chef Daniel Humm's Eleven Madison Park, The Core Club, The Musket Room and Clio. He designed a line of dinnerware ("Kona") for Crate & Barrel. Pandolfi also worked as a product designer at Dransfield and Ross for a year prior to joining Cambridge Silversmiths.

An avid fisherman, Pandolfi co-authored the book Spin Fishing Basics.  He is married to Erica Duecy, the Editor in Chief & Chief Content Officer at VinePair, and his brother, Chris Pandolfi, plays banjo in The Infamous Stringdusters.

References

External links
Jono Pandolfi, official web site
Cambridge Silversmiths, official web site
Dransfield and Ross, official website

American potters
Living people
1976 births
Skidmore College alumni
Artists from New York City